Clifford Craig (born 1963) is an Irish international lawn bowler and former British champion.

Bowls career
Craig won the Irish National Bowls Championships singles in 1998 and subsequently won the singles at the British Isles Bowls Championships in 1999. He also won the 1989 Irish triples title.

In 2007 he won the pairs silver medal at the Atlantic Bowls Championships.

References

1963 births
Living people
Male lawn bowls players from Northern Ireland